Camay is an American brand of bar soap owned by Unilever. It was introduced in 1926 by Procter & Gamble and was marketed as a "white, pure soap for women," as many soaps of the time were colored to mask impurities. Camay's slogan for many years was "Camay: the soap for beautiful women." It was later replaced with "For your most beautiful complexion at every age."

In December, 2014, Procter & Gamble announced that it was selling Camay to Unilever. The transaction was completed in 2015, but Unilever had not yet announced when it would start producing Camay soap.

Media sponsorship 
For many years, Camay was a major sponsor of the soap operas As the World Turns and Search for Tomorrow.

Camay started gaining popularity in Eastern Europe with 12 new scents being introduced starting from 2004.

A Hungarian online campaign called The Code of Seduction (in Hungarian: A Csábitás Kódja) invites people to fill out a test which tells them which scent will fit their personality and mood the best.

Spokesmodels
In the 1970s, its television spokesmodels included Princess Luciana Pignatelli, an Italian socialite, writer, and cosmetics executive, and Shelley Long. Other spokesmodel's included Katie Boyle, Gail Barclay, Lynn Clayton, Julie Dawn Cole, Stacy Dorning, Claire Faulconbridge, Lynne Frederick, Sylvie Granotier, Nicola Pagett, Julie Peasgood and Natasha Pyne.

References

External links
Camay Europe

Products introduced in 1926
Soap brands
Unilever brands